Heliothis cruentata is a moth of the family Noctuidae. It is found in India. It was described by Frederic Moore in 1881.

References

Heliothis
Moths of Asia
Moths described in 1881